The Linden Avenue School in the Point Breeze neighborhood of  Pittsburgh, Pennsylvania is a building from 1903. It was listed on the National Register of Historic Places in 1986.

The building now houses a preK-5 elementary school with a Mandarin Chinese emphasis, a city magnet school.

See also
Park Place School

References

External links
 Lincoln Technology Academy

School buildings completed in 1903
Schools in Pittsburgh
School buildings on the National Register of Historic Places in Pennsylvania
Defunct schools in Pennsylvania
Pittsburgh History & Landmarks Foundation Historic Landmarks
1903 establishments in Pennsylvania
National Register of Historic Places in Pittsburgh